Colorado Springs is a home rule municipality in and the county seat of El Paso County, Colorado, United States. It is the largest city in El Paso County, with a population of 478,961 at the 2020 United States Census, a 15.02% increase since 2010. Colorado Springs is the second-most populous city and the most extensive city in the state of Colorado, and the 40th-most populous city in the United States. It is the principal city of the Colorado Springs metropolitan area and the second-most prominent city of the Front Range Urban Corridor.

The city is the largest city north of Mexico above 6000 feet in elevation.

History

The Ute, Arapaho and Cheyenne peoples were the first recorded inhabiting the area which would become Colorado Springs. Part of the territory included in the United States' 1803 Louisiana Purchase, the current city area was designated part of the 1854 Kansas Territory. In 1859, after the first local settlement was established, it became part of the Jefferson Territory on October 24 and of El Paso County on November 28. Colorado City at the Front Range confluence of Fountain and Camp creeks was "formally organized on August13, 1859" during the Pikes Peak Gold Rush. It served as the capital of the Colorado Territory from November 5, 1861, until August 14, 1862, when the capital was moved to Golden, before it was finally moved to Denver in 1867.  So many immigrants from England had settled in Colorado Springs by the early 1870s that Colorado Springs was locally referred to as "Little London." In 1871 the Colorado Springs Company laid out the towns of La Font (later called Manitou Springs) and Fountain Colony, upstream and downstream respectively, of Colorado City. Within a year, Fountain Colony was renamed Colorado Springs and officially incorporated. The El Paso County seat shifted from Colorado City in 1873 to the Town of Colorado Springs. On December 1, 1880, Colorado Springs expanded northward with two annexations.

The second period of annexations was during 188990, and included Seavey's Addition, West Colorado Springs, East End, and another North End addition. In 1891 the Broadmoor Land Company built the Broadmoor suburb, which included the Broadmoor Casino, and by December 12, 1895, the city had "four Mining Exchanges and 275 mining brokers." By 1898, the city was designated into quadrants by the north-south Cascade Avenue and the east-west Washington/Pikes Peak avenues.

From 1899 to 1901 Tesla Experimental Station operated on Knob Hill, and aircraft flights to the Broadmoor's neighboring fields began in 1919. Alexander Airport north of the city opened in 1925, and in 1927 the original Colorado Springs Municipal Airport land was purchased east of the city.

The city's military presence began during World War II, beginning with Camp Carson (now the 135,000-acre Fort Carson base) that was established in 1941. During the war, the United States Army Air Forces leased land adjacent to the municipal airfield, naming it Peterson Field in December 1942.

In November 1950, Ent Air Force Base was selected as the Cold War headquarters for Air Defense Command (ADC). The former WWII Army Air Base, Peterson Field, which had been inactivated at the end of the war, was re-opened in 1951 as a U.S. Air Force base.  North American Aerospace Defense Command (NORAD) was established as a hardened command and control center within the Cheyenne Mountain Complex during the Cold War. 

Between 1965 and 1968, the University of Colorado Colorado Springs, Pikes Peak State College and Colorado Technical University were established in or near the city. In 1977 most of the former Ent AFB became a US Olympic training center. The Libertarian Party was founded within the city in the 1970s.

On October 1, 1981, the Broadmoor Addition, Cheyenne Canon, Ivywild, Skyway, and Stratton Meadows were annexed after the Colorado Supreme Court "overturned a district court decision that voided the annexation". Further annexations expanding the city include the Nielson Addition and Vineyard Commerce Park Annexation in September 2008.

Geography

The city lies in a semi-arid Steppe climate region with the Southern Rocky Mountains to the west, the Palmer Divide to the north, high plains further east, and high desert lands to the south when leaving Fountain and approaching Pueblo.

Colorado Springs has the greatest total area of any municipality in Colorado. At the 2020 United States Census, the city had a total area of  including  of water.

Metropolitan area
Colorado Springs has many features of a modern urban area such as parks, bike trails, and open spaces. However, it is not exempt from problems that typically plague cities experiencing tremendous growth such as overcrowded roads and highways, crime, sprawl, and government budgetary issues. Many of the problems are indirectly or directly caused by the city's difficulty in coping with the large population growth experienced since 1997, and the annexation of the Banning Lewis Ranch area to accommodate further population growth of 175,000 future residents.

Climate

Colorado Springs has a cooler, dry-winter semi-arid climate (Köppen BSk), and its location just east of the Rocky Mountains affords it the rapid warming influence from chinook winds during winter but also subjects it to drastic day-to-day variability in weather conditions. Due to unusually low precipitation for several years after flooding in 1999, Colorado Springs enacted lawn water restrictions in 2002. These were lifted in 2005 but permanently reinstated in December 2019.

Colorado Springs is one of the most active lightning strike areas in the United States. This natural phenomenon led Nikola Tesla to select Colorado Springs as the preferred location to build his lab and study electricity.

Seasonal climate

December is typically the coldest month, averaging . Historically, January had been the coldest month, but, in recent years, December has had both lower daily maxima and minima. Typically, there are 5.2 nights with sub- lows and 23.6 days where the high does not rise above freezing.

In addition, 8 of the top 10 heaviest 24-hour snowfalls have occurred from March to May. Summers are warm, with July, the warmest month, averaging , and 18 days of + highs annually. Due to the high elevation and aridity, nights are usually relatively cool and rarely does the low remain above . Dry weather generally prevails, but brief afternoon thunderstorms are common, especially in July and August when the city receives the majority of its annual rainfall, due to the North American monsoon.

The first autumn freeze and the last freeze in the spring, on average, occur on October 2 and May 6, respectively; the average window for measurable snowfall (≥) is October 21 through April 25.

Climate data

Cityscape

Demographics

As of the 2020 United States Census, the population of the City of Colorado Springs was 478,961 (40th most populous U.S. city), the population of the Colorado Springs Metropolitan Statistical Area was 755,105 (79th most populous MSA), and the population of the Front Range Urban Corridor was 5,055,344.

As of the April 2010 census, 78.8% of the population of the city was White (non-Hispanic Whites were 70.7% of the population, compared with 86.6% in 1970), 16.1% Hispanic or Latino of any race (compared with 7.4% in 1970), 6.3% Black or African American, 3.0% Asian, 1.0% descended from indigenous peoples of the Americas, 0.3% descended from indigenous Hawaiians and other Pacific islanders, 5.5% of some other race, and 5.1% of two or more races. Mexican Americans made up 14.6% of the city's population, compared with 9.1% in 1990. The median age in the city was 35 years.

Economy
Colorado Springs's economy is driven primarily by the military, the high-tech industry, and tourism, in that order. The city is experiencing growth in the service sectors. In June 2019, before the COVID-19 pandemic, the unemployment rate was 3.3%. The state's unemployment rate in June 2022 was 3.4% compared to 3.6% for the nation.

Military

, there are nearly 45,000 active-duty troops in Colorado Springs. There are more than 100,000 veterans and thousands of reservists. The military and defense contractors supply more than 40% of the Pikes Peak region's economy.

Colorado Springs is home to the Peterson Space Force Base, Schriever Space Force Base, Cheyenne Mountain Space Force Station, U.S. Space Command, and Space Operations Command— the largest contingent of space service military installations. They are responsible for intelligence gathering, space operations, and cyber missions. 

Peterson Space Force Base is responsible for the North American Aerospace Defense Command (NORAD) and the United States Northern Command (USNORTHCOM) headquarters, Space Operations Command, and Space Deltas 2, 3, and 7. Located at Peterson is the 302nd Airlift Wing, an Air Force Reserve unit, that transports passengers and cargo and fights wildfires.

Schriever Space Force Base is responsible for Joint Task Force-Space Defense and Space Deltas 6, 8, and 9. The NORAD and USNORTHCOM Alternate Command Center is located at the Cheyenne Mountain Complex. Within the mountain complex, the Cheyenne Mountain Space Force Station has been operated by Space Operations Command. On January 13, 2021, the Air Force announced a new permanent home for Space Command, moving it from Colorado Springs to Huntsville, Alabama in 2026, but the decision could be reversed by Congress.

Army divisions are trained and stationed at Fort Carson. The United States Air Force Academy was established after World War II, on land donated by the City of Colorado Springs.

Defense industry
The defense industry forms a significant part of the Colorado Springs economy, with some of the city's largest employers being defense contractors. Some defense corporations have left or downsized city campuses, but slight growth has been recorded. Significant defense corporations in the city include Northrop Grumman, Boeing, General Dynamics, L3Harris Technologies, SAIC, ITT, Lockheed Martin, and Bluestaq. The Space Foundation is based in Colorado Springs.

High-tech industry
A large percentage of Colorado Springs's economy is still based on manufacturing high-tech and complex electronic equipment. The high-tech sector in the Colorado Springs area has decreased its overall presence from 2000 to 2006 (from around 21,000 to around 8,000), with notable reductions in information technology and complex electronic equipment. Current trends project the high-tech employment ratio will continue to decrease.

High-tech corporations with connections to the city include: Verizon Business, a telecommunications firm, at its height had nearly 1300 employees in 2008. Hewlett-Packard still has some sales, support, and SAN storage engineering center for the computer industry. Storage Networking Industry Association is the home of the SNIA Technology Center. Keysight Technologies, spun off in 2014 from Agilent, which was itself spun off from HP in 1999 as an independent, publicly traded company, has its oscilloscope research and development division based in Colorado Springs. Intel had 250 employees in 2009. The Intel facility is now used for the centralized unemployment offices, social services, El Paso county offices, and a bitcoin mining facility. Microchip Technology (formerly Atmel), is a chip fabrication organization. The Apple Inc. facility was sold to Sanmina-SCI in 1996.

Culture and contemporary life

Tourism

Almost immediately following the arrival of railroads beginning in 1871, the city's location at the base of Pikes Peak and the Rocky Mountains made it a popular tourism destination. Tourism is the third largest employer in the Pikes Peak region, accounting for more than 16,000 jobs. In 2018, 23 million day and overnight visitors came to the area, contributing $2.4 billion in revenue.

Colorado Springs has more than 55 attractions and activities in the area, including Garden of the Gods park, United States Air Force Academy, the ANA Money Museum, Cheyenne Mountain Zoo, Colorado Springs Fine Arts Center at Colorado College, Old Colorado City, The National Museum of World War II Aviation, and the U.S. Olympic & Paralympic Training Center. In 2020, the U.S. Olympic & Paralympic Museum opened; the Flying W Ranch Chuckwagon Dinner & Western Show reopened in 2020. A new Pikes Peak Summit Complex opened at the 14,115-foot summit in 2021. The Manitou and Pikes Peak Railway also reopened in 2021.

The downtown Colorado Springs Visitor Information Center offers free area information to leisure and business travelers. The Cultural Office of the Pikes Peak Region (COPPeR), also downtown, supports and advocates for the arts throughout the Pikes Peak Region. It operates the PeakRadar website to communicate city events.

Annual cultural events

Colorado Springs is home to the annual Colorado Springs Labor Day Lift Off, a hot air balloon festival that takes place over Labor Day weekend at the city's Memorial Park.

Other annual events include: a comic book convention and science fiction convention called GalaxyFest in February, a pride parade called PrideFest in July, the Greek Festival, the Pikes Peak Ascent and Marathon, and the Steers & Beers Whiskey and Beer Festival in August, and the Emma Crawford Coffin Races and Festival in nearby Manitou Springs and Arts Month in October.

The Colorado Springs Festival of Lights Parade is held the first Saturday in December. The parade is held on Tejon Street in Downtown Colorado Springs.

Breweries

In 2017, Colorado had the third-most craft breweries at 348. Breweries and microbreweries have become popular in Colorado Springs, which hosts over 30 of them.

Religious institutions

Although houses of worship of almost every major world religion are within the city, Colorado Springs has in particular attracted a large influx of Evangelical Christians and Christian organizations in recent years. At one time Colorado Springs was the national headquarters for 81 different religious organizations, earning the city the tongue-in-cheek nicknames "the Evangelical Vatican" and "The Christian Mecca." 

Religious groups with regional or international headquarters in Colorado Springs include:

Association of Christian Schools International
Biblica
Children's HopeChest
Community Bible Study
Compassion International
David C. Cook/Integrity Music
Development Associates International
Engineering Ministries International 
Family Talk
Focus on the Family
Global Action
HCJB
Hope & Home
The Navigators
One Child Matters
Roman Catholic Diocese of Colorado Springs
VisionTrust
WAY-FM Media Group
Young Life

Marijuana

Although Colorado voters approved Colorado Amendment 64, a constitutional amendment in 2012 legalizing retail sales of marijuana for recreational purposes, the Colorado Springs city council voted not to permit retail shops in the city, as was allowed in the amendment. Medical marijuana outlets continue to operate in Colorado Springs. In 2015, there were 91 medical marijuana clinics in the city, which reported sales of $59.6 million in 2014, up 11 percent from the previous year but without recreational marijuana shops. On April 26, 2016, Colorado Springs city council decided to extend the current six-month moratorium to eighteen months with no new licenses to be granted until May 2017. A scholarly paper suggested the city will give up $25.4 million in tax revenue and fees if the city continues to thwart the industry from opening within the city limits. As of March 1, 2018, there were 131 medical marijuana centers and no recreational cannabis stores. As of 2019 Colorado Springs is still one of seven towns that have only allowed for medical marijuana.

In popular culture
Colorado Springs has been the subject of or setting for many books, films and television shows, and is a frequent backdrop for political thrillers and military-themed stories because of its many military installations and vital importance to the United States' continental defense. Notable television series using the city as a setting include Dr. Quinn, Medicine Woman, Homicide Hunter and the Stargate series Stargate SG-1, as well as the films WarGames, The Prestige, and BlacKkKlansman.

In a North Korean propaganda video released in April 2013, Colorado Springs was inexplicably singled out as one of four targets for a missile strike. The video failed to pinpoint Colorado Springs on the map, instead showing a spot somewhere in Louisiana.

Sports

Olympic sports

Colorado Springs, dubbed Olympic City USA, is home to the United States Olympic & Paralympic Training Center and the headquarters of the United States Olympic & Paralympic Committee and the United States Anti-Doping Agency.

Further, over 50 national sports organizations (non-Olympic) headquarter in Colorado Springs. These include the National Strength and Conditioning Association, Sports Incubator, a various non-Olympic Sports (such as USA Ultimate), and more.

Colorado Springs and Denver hosted the 1962 World Ice Hockey Championships.

The city has a long association with the sport of figure skating, having hosted the U.S. Figure Skating Championships six times and the World Figure Skating Championships five times. It is home to the World Figure Skating Museum and Hall of Fame and the Broadmoor Skating Club, a notable training center for the sport. In recent years, the Broadmoor World Arena has hosted skating events such as Skate America and the Four Continents Figure Skating Championships.

Baseball
The Colorado Springs Snow Sox professional baseball team is based in Colorado Springs. The team is a member of the Pecos League, an independent baseball league which is not affiliated with Major or Minor League Baseball.

Pikes Peak International Hill Climb

The Pikes Peak International Hill Climb (PPIHC), also known as The Race to the Clouds, is an annual invitational automobile and motorcycle hill climb to the summit of Pikes Peak, every year on the last Sunday of June. The highway wasn't completely paved until 2011.

Local professional teams

Local collegiate teams
The local colleges feature many sports teams. Notable among them are several nationally competitive NCAA Division I teams: United States Air Force Academy (Falcons) Football, Basketball and Hockey and Colorado College (Tigers) Hockey, and Women's Soccer.

Rodeo
Colorado Springs was the original headquarters of the Professional Bull Riders (PBR) from its founding in 1992 until 2005, when the organization was moved to Pueblo.

Parks, trails and open space

The city's Parks, Recreation and Cultural Services manage 136 neighborhood parks, eight community parks, seven regional parks, and five sports complexes, totaling .

Parks

Garden of the Gods is on Colorado Springs's western edge. It is a National Natural Landmark, with  red/orange sandstone rock formations often viewed against a backdrop of the snow-capped Pikes Peak. This park is free to the public and offers many recreational opportunities, such as hiking, rock climbing, cycling, horseback riding and tours. It offers a variety of annual events, one of the most popular of which is the Starlight Spectacular, a recreational bike ride held every summer to benefit the Trails and Open Space Coalition of Colorado Springs.

Colorado Springs has several major city parks, such as Palmer Park, America the Beautiful Park in downtown Colorado Springs, Memorial Park, which includes many sports fields, an indoor swimming pool and skating rink, a skateboard bowl and two half-pipes, and Monument Valley Park, which has walking and biking paths, an outdoor swimming pool and pickleball courts. Monument Valley Park also has Tahama Spring, the original spring in Colorado Springs. Austin Bluffs Park affords a place of recreation in eastern Colorado Springs. El Paso County Regional Parks include Bear Creek Regional Park, Bear Creek Dog Park, Fox Run Regional Park and Fountain Creek Regional Park and Nature Center. Ponderosa pine (Pinus ponderosa), Gambel oak (Quercus gambelii), narrowleaf yucca (Yucca angustissima, syn. Yucca glauca) and prickly pear cactus (Opuntia macrorhiza).

Trails
Three trails, the New Santa Fe Regional Trail, Pikes Peak Greenway and Fountain Creek Regional Trail, form a continuous path from Palmer Lake, through Colorado Springs, to Fountain, Colorado. The majority of the trail between Palmer Lake and Fountain is a soft surface breeze gravel trail. A major segment of the trail within the Colorado Springs city limits is paved. The trails, except Monument Valley Park trails, may be used for equestrian traffic. Motorized vehicles are not allowed on the trails. Many of the trails are interconnected, having main spine trails, like the Pikes Peak Greenway, that lead to secondary trails.

Government

On November 2, 2010, Colorado Springs voters adopted a council-strong mayor form of government. The City of Colorado Springs transitioned to the new system of government in 2011. Under the council-strong mayor system of government, the mayor is the chief executive and the city council is the legislative branch. The mayor is a full-time elected position and not a member of the council. The council has nine members, six of whom represent one of six equally populated districts each. The remaining three members are elected at-large.

Colorado Springs City Hall was built from 1902 to 1904 on land donated by W. S. Stratton.

City Council
The Colorado Springs City Council consists of nine elected officials, six of whom represent districts and three of whom represent the city at-large.

 District 1 – Dave Donelson
 District 2 – Randy Helms – Council President Pro-Tem
 District 3 – Stephannie Fortune
 District 4 – Yolanda Avila
 District 5 – Nancy Henjum
 District 6 – Mike O'Malley
 At-Large – Bill Murray
 At-Large – Tom Strand – Council President
 At-Large – Wayne Williams

Politics
In 2017 Caleb Hannan wrote in Politico that Colorado Springs was "staunchly Republican", "a right-wing counterweight to liberal Boulder", and that a study ranked it "the fourth most conservative city in America". In the 2016 presidential election, Donald Trump's margin of victory in El Paso County was 22 points. That year Hannan wrote that downtown Colorado Springs had a different political vibe from the overall area's and that there were "superficial signs of changing demographics". In 2020 the shift toward the political center continued as the incumbent Republican, Donald Trump, edged out Democrat Joe Biden by only 10.8% in El Paso County

Education

Primary and secondary education

Public schools
The public education in the city is divided into several school districts: 
 Colorado Springs School District 11 (center of the city)
 Academy School District 20 (north end)
 Falcon School District 49 (east side)
 Widefield School District 3 (south end)
 Fountain-Fort Carson School District 8 (far south end)
 Harrison School District 2 (south central area)
 James Irwin Charter High School (east central area)
 Cheyenne Mountain School District 12 (southwest corner)
 The Vanguard School, CIVA Charter High School and The Classical Academy are charter schools.

Private schools
 Roman Catholic Diocese of Colorado Springs schools including within the boundaries of the city
 Corpus Christi Catholic School - PreK-8
 Divine Redeemer Catholic School - PreK-8
 St. Gabriel Classical Academy - PreK-3
 St. Paul Catholic School - PreK-8
 St. Mary's High School - an independent Catholic high school
 Fountain Valley School of Colorado - a  residential high school established in 1930 with a current enrollment of about 240.
 The Colorado Springs School -  a preK-12 school established in 1962 with a current enrollment of about 300.
 Colorado Springs Christian Schools - A PreK–12th grade Christian school with two campuses started in 1972 and with an enrollment of about 1,150 in 2021.
 Evangelical Christian Academy - a preK-12 school established in 1971 with a current enrollment of about 350.
 Pikes Peak Christian School - a preK-12 Christian school with a current enrollment of about 210 

In addition the state of Colorado runs the Colorado School for the Deaf and Blind, a residential school for people up to age 21 and established in 1874, in the city.

Higher education

State institutions offering bachelors and graduate degree programs in Colorado Springs include University of Colorado Colorado Springs (UCCS) with more than 12,000 students, and, Pikes Peak State College which offers mostly two-year degree associate degrees.  The United States Air Force Academy is a federal institution offering bachelor degrees for officer candidates.

Private non-profit institutions include Colorado College established in 1874 with about 2,000 undergraduates. Colorado Christian University has its Colorado Springs Center in the city.

Private for-profit institutions include Colorado Technical University whose main campus is in Colorado Springs and IntelliTec College a technical training school.

Transportation

Major highways and roads

Interstate highways
Colorado Springs is primarily served by one interstate highway. In El Paso County it is known as Ronald Reagan Highway.

State and U.S. highways
A number of state and U.S. highways serve the city. State Highway 21 is a major east side semi-expressway from Black Forest to Fountain, known locally and co-signed as Powers Boulevard. State Highway 83 runs north–south from central Denver to northern Colorado Springs. State Highway 94 runs east–west from western Cheyenne County to eastern Colorado Springs where it terminates at US 24. US 24 is a major route through the city and county, providing access to Woodland Park via Ute Pass to the west and downtown, Nob Hill and numerous suburbs to the east. It is co-signed with Platte Ave after SH 21 and originally carried local traffic through town. The Martin Luther King Jr Bypass runs from I-25 near Circle Drive along Fountain Blvd to SH 21, then east again. State Highway 115 begins in Cañon City, traveling north along the western edge of Fort Carson; when it reaches the city limits it merges with Nevada Avenue, a signed Business Route of US 85. US 85 and SH 115 are concurrent between Lake Avenue and I-25. US 85 enters the city at Fountain and was signed at Venetucci Blvd, Lake Avenue, and Nevada Avenue at various points in history; however most of US 85 is concurrent with I-25 and is not signed.

County and city roads
In November 2015, voters in Colorado Springs overwhelmingly passed ballot measure 2C, dedicating funds from a temporary sales tax increase to much needed road and infrastructure improvements over five years. This temporary increase is estimated to bring in approximately $50 million annually, which will be used solely to improve roads and infrastructure. The ballot measure passed by a margin of approximately 65–35%.

In 2004, the voters of Colorado Springs and El Paso County established the Pikes Peak Rural Transportation Authority. 

In early 2010, the city of Colorado Springs approved an expansion of the northernmost part of Powers Boulevard in order to create an Interstate 25 bypass commonly referred to as the Copper Ridge Expansion.

Airport
Colorado Springs Airport (COS; ICAO: KCOS) has been in operation since 1925. It is the second-largest commercial airport in the state, after Denver International Airport (DEN; ICAO: KDEN). COS is considered to be a joint-use civilian and military airport, as Peterson Space Force Base is a tenant of the airport. The airport handled 817,000 passengers from October 2020–October 2021, and is served by American, Delta,  Southwest, and United.

Bicycling

In April 2018, the Colorado Springs City Council approved a Bike Master Plan. The vision of the city's Bike Master Plan is "a healthy and vibrant Colorado Springs where bicycling is one of many transportation options for a large portion of the population, and where a well-connected and well-maintained network of urban trails, single-track, and on-street infrastructure offers a bicycling experience for present and future generations that is safe, convenient, and fun for getting around, getting in shape, or getting away." Bike lanes in Colorado Springs have not been deployed without controversy. According to The Gazette, their readers "have mixed feelings for new bike lanes." In December 2016, the City removed a bike lane along Research Parkway due to overwhelming opposition; an online survey found that 80.5% of respondents opposed the bike lane. The Gazette has stated that since the Bike Master Plan was adopted by City Council, "no issue has elicited more argument in The Gazette pages," and due to this immense public interest, on February 25, 2019, The Gazette hosted a town hall meeting called "Battle of the Bike Lanes."

Walkability
A 2011 study by Walk Score ranked Colorado Springs 34th most walkable of fifty largest U.S. cities.

Mountain Metropolitan Transit

Mountain Metropolitan Transit (MMT) is testing Battery Electric Buses (BEB), and if the buses perform well, the agency plans to acquire its first three BEBs in 2021 using funds from the Volkswagen emissions scandal and resulting lawsuit and settlement. On April 22, 2022, Mountain Metro unveiled four new all-electric Proterra ZX5 buses to be added to their fleet. The new buses join their current fleet of 67 clean diesel buses. They are funded by the Colorado Department of Transportation Division of Transit and Rail Settlement Transit Bus Replacement Program, Volkswagen Diesel Emission Settlement trust, and Federal transit Administration 5339(b) Buses and Bus Facilities Program grant. The Proterra ZX5 buses run 220 to 330 miles on a single charge, and cost $1.2 million per bus.

Mountain Metro Mobility

Mountain Metro Mobility is an Americans with Disabilities Act (ADA) federally mandated complementary ADA paratransit service, which provides demand-response service for individuals with mobility needs that prevent them from using the fixed-route bus system.

Mountain Metro Rides

Mountain Metro Rides offers alternative transportation options to residents of the Pikes Peak Region. The program is designed to reduce congestion and pollution by encouraging people to commute by carpool, vanpool, bicycling or walking.

Bustang

Bustang provides intercity transportation to Colorado Springs. It is part of the South and Outrider lines, which connect to Denver and to Lamar. There is an additional line that connects Colorado Springs directly to the Denver Tech Center.

Notable people

Sister cities

Colorado Springs' sister cities are:
 Fujiyoshida, Yamanashi, Japan (1962)
 Kaohsiung, Taiwan (1983)
 Smolensk, Smolensk Oblast, Russia (1993)
 Bishkek, Kyrgyzstan (1994)
 Nuevo Casas Grandes, Chihuahua, Mexico (1996)
 Canterbury-Bankstown, Sydney, New South Wales, Australia (1999)
 Olympia, Peloponnese,  Greece (2014)

Colorado Springs's sister city organization began when it became partners with Fujiyoshida. The torii gate erected to commemorate the relationship stands at the corner of Bijou Street and Nevada Avenue, and is one of the city's most recognizable landmarks. The torii gate, crisscrossed bridge and shrine, in the median between Platte and Bijou Streets downtown, were a gift to Colorado Springs, erected in 1966 by the Rotary Club of Colorado Springs to celebrate the friendship between the two communities. A plaque near the torii gate states that "the purpose of the sister city relationship is to promote understanding between the people of our two countries and cities". The Fujiyoshida Student exchange program has become an annual event.

In 2006 and 2010, the Bankstown TAP (Talent Advancement Program) performed with the Youth Symphony and the Colorado Springs Children's Chorale as part of the annual "In Harmony" program. A notable similarity between Colorado Springs and its sister cities is their geographic positions: three of the seven cities are near the foot of a major mountain or mountain range, as is Colorado Springs.

See also

Club Q nightclub shooting
Colorado
Bibliography of Colorado
Index of Colorado-related articles
Outline of Colorado
List of counties in Colorado
List of municipalities in Colorado
List of places in Colorado
List of statistical areas in Colorado
Front Range Urban Corridor
South Central Colorado Urban Area
Colorado Springs, CO Metropolitan Statistical Area
Media in Colorado Springs, Colorado
Tuberculosis treatment in Colorado Springs

Notes

References

External links

City of Colorado Springs website
CDOT map of the City of Colorado Springs
Visit Colorado Springs official website

 
Cities in Colorado
County seats in Colorado
Pikes Peak
Populated places established in 1871
Cities in El Paso County, Colorado
Former colonial and territorial capitals in the United States
1871 establishments in Colorado Territory